Alegría-Dulantzi, formerly known in Spanish as Alegría de Álava, is a village and municipality located in the province of Álava, in the Basque Country, northern Spain.

The Battle of Alegría de Álava took place here in 1834.

Geography

Administrative subdivisions 
Alegría-Dulantzi is divided into 2 villages, both of them organized as concejos. By far the larger of the two is the municipal centre and township of Alegría-Dulantzi itself, which accounts for some 95% of the municipality's population. The other one is Egileta, an exclave located to the southeast.

References

External links
 

Alegria de Alava